Gypsum Wash is an ephemeral stream or wash in Clark County, Nevada. Gypsum Wash was originally a tributary of Las Vegas Wash before the formation of Lake Mead which submerged their confluence under Las Vegas Bay.

References

Tributaries of the Colorado River in Nevada
Rivers of Clark County, Nevada
Lake Mead
Washes of Nevada